Futebol Clube Unidos Pinheirense  is a sports club based in the village of Valbom, Portugal. The futsal team of Unidos Pinheirense plays in the Portuguese Futsal First Division.

Current squad

References

External links
 Zerozero

Futsal clubs in Portugal